She is a  post apocalyptic film directed by Avi Nesher and starring Sandahl Bergman. She was based on H. Rider Haggard's 1887 novel She: A History of Adventure.

Plot
Set 23 years after a nuclear war called "The Cancellation," in a land of warring tribes, the film follows Tom and his friend Dick, whose sister Hari has been captured by a powerful tribe, the Norks. Tom and Dick set out to find and rescue Hari, attempting to avoid the dangerous tribes they see along the way. They are ultimately captured by a matriarchal clan called the Urechs, led by "She" (Sandahl Bergman). The two manage to escape; She's forces track them down, but She decides to help them in their quest after hearing the prophecy from a local seer. She and her lieutenant Shanda join Tom and Dick on their travels.

They encounter many other tribes, each led by their own post-apocalyptic 'god', with the encounters usually ending in a battle. Each tribal ‘god’ has an army of mutants with special abilities apparently granted by the nuclear radiation. One psychic communist, Godan, can levitate his enemies but is betrayed by his second-in-command, a woman in red who is upset that Godan has taken She as a lover. The heroes also face a tutu-wearing giant, toga-wearing werewolves, high society vampires, and mutants bandaged like Egyptian mummies. Over the course of these encounters, the group becomes separated, and they make their way separately to the Nork fortress.

After being captured by the swastika-wearing Norks, She, Tom, and Dick, all masked, are forced into a gladiator combat melee. Fortunately, after dispatching the other combatants, the three recognize each other and stop the fight. Hari, who has been a concubine of the Nork leader, rushes to their side. The Nork leader considers this an affront, and he tells the party that they may leave, but that as punishment his forces will attack and enslave the Urechs the next day.

They are released, but She decides to mount an ambush of the Nork forces at a bridge, before the Norks can get close to Urech lands. Tom, Dick, and Hari aid her in setting numerous traps. When the Nork forces arrive, the party faces wave after wave of combatants. As the Norks finally begin to overwhelm them, the party is rescued when Shanda and a squad of Urech warriors arrive and rout the remaining Norks. Finally victorious, the group celebrates. Dick and Shanda, She’s second-in-command, have fallen in love, and Dick elects to stay with the Urechs. Tom and She silently decide to love each other from a distance. As Tom takes a barge with his sister Hari to other faraway lands, a song about eternal love plays in the background.

Cast 
Sandahl Bergman – She
David Goss – Tom
Quin Kessler – Shandra
Harrison Muller – Dick
Elena Wiedermann – Hari
Gordon Mitchell – Hector

Production
In the January 1983 issue of Starlog, it was reported that Sandahl Bergman was currently in Rome filming She.

Release
She was released in the United States on December 25, 1985, with a 106-minute running time.

Reception
TV Guide gave the film two of five stars, noting the film was full of lowbrow humor and an incoherent plot, and that after a delayed release it "finally was foisted onto audiences courtesy of the Cinemax cable television network, a veritable dumping ground for movies that can't even get into third-run cinemas." In John Stanley's Creature Features movie guide, the film also received two of five stars, noting it was a black parody full of anachronisms. As of June 2019, the film had a score of 18% at Rotten Tomatoes. Kim Newman found the film similar to others of the genre, with little new to offer.

Neil Gaiman reviewed She for Imagine magazine, and stated that the film was "just bad enough to be very funny for those willing to ignore the fact that the plot, the acting and the direction are of Plan Nine From Outer Space standard. A must for anyone who likes throwing popcorn at the screen."

See also

 She: A History of Adventure
 She (1935 film)
 She (1965 film)

References

External links

Review

1980s science fiction films
Films based on She
Films directed by Avi Nesher
Italian post-apocalyptic films
Peplum films
Sword and sandal films
1980s Italian films